Seyi Olajengbesi (born 17 November 1980 in Ibadan) is a Nigerian former professional footballer who played as a defender who spent most of his career in Germany, playing for Alemannia Aachen, SC Freiburg, and SV Sandhausen.

References

External links
 
 

Living people
1980 births
Sportspeople from Ibadan
Association football defenders
Nigerian footballers
Nigeria international footballers
SC Freiburg players
Alemannia Aachen players
SV Sandhausen players
Expatriate footballers in Germany
Shooting Stars S.C. players
Plateau United F.C. players
Yoruba sportspeople
Bundesliga players
2. Bundesliga players
3. Liga players